Koodathayi Cyanide Murders were a series of criminal incidents that occurred at Koodathayi in Kozhikode district, in the South Indian state of Kerala. The crimes were investigated in late 2019, involving the mystery of 6 murders over a span of 14 years. The criminal cases drew considerable media and public interest in Kerala, and eventually led to the arrest of Jolly Joseph. The case also led to a debate on the legal and moral implications.

Timeline of the crimes

In 2002, Annamma Thomas, the mother-in-law of the accused, died after consuming a glass of water. As the normal day, the day of her death she went for a walk while she returned she took the glass of water. After that she felt uneasy and dizzy . She was stumbling and tried to keep herself steady and fell down while walking in front of her room entrance. When she was hospitalized doctors declared that since she had a heart attack she died. In 2008, Tom Thomas, Annamma's husband passed away after swooning and collapsing. Their daughter-in-law Jolly Joseph was allegedly present on the spot on both occasions. In 2011, Roy Thomas, Jolly's then-husband, died after consuming rice and curry. He was found dead in a bathroom which was locked from the inside. The cause of death was then ruled as suicide due to financial issues as the post-mortem report showed traces of poison. Roy Thomas' maternal uncle Mathew Manjayadil called for a post-mortem report and an inquiry into Roy's cause of death. In 2014, Mathew swooned and died after Jolly allegedly gave him poison-laden whisky. The deceased Roy Thomas has a cousin called Shaju Zachariah. The same year, Shaju's toddler daughter, Alphine Shaju, died after "choking on food". In 2016, Jolly allegedly gave Sily Shaju, Alphine's mother, a glass of water and the latter died on the spot with excessive frothing at the mouth.In 2018, Rojo Thomas came down to Koodathai and filed a series of RTI applications. From the government hospital, he received a copy of the autopsy report of his brother’s body.“ When he read the report, he found out that what Jolly told us was wrong. Jolly told us he had food at 3.30 pm and hadn’t had food after that. But it was clear in the post-mortem report that he had rice and chickpeas curry at 8.30 pm,” said Bawa. “Acute cyanide poisoning can result in death in a matter of seconds. Cyanide does not accumulate in the body and so it is rare to encounter it in slow death cases,” explained Dr V V Pillay, head of Forensic Medicine & Toxicology, Amrita Institute of Medical Sciences in Kochi.

About the accused

47-year-old Jolly Joseph is the prime suspect in the murder of six members of the family she married into. It was Rojo Thomas, Roy Thomas' brother, who complained to the police about the six unnatural deaths whose investigation led to Jolly Joseph. Following her arrest in October 2019, Jolly has confessed to using cyanide to kill the six aforementioned people. She allegedly obtained the cyanide with the help of M. S. Mathew and Praji Kumar, who have also been arrested.

Jolly Joseph

Jolly is originally from Kattappana, Idukki district and a first year college dropout. She married her first husband Roy Thomas in 1997. Jolly and Roy had two sons, now aged 15 and 21. According to her neighbour, Jolly lied to fellow villagers about being a M.Com. graduate and having a job at the prestigious National Institute of Technology Calicut. However, her true whereabouts during her daily outings to fake her "job" remains uncertain. In 2011, her husband Roy Thomas died under mysterious circumstances. Following the death of Shaju Zachariah's wife in 2016, Jolly married Shaju. Jolly has been described as "jovial, friendly, jolly and pious" by people who knew her.

M. S. Mathew 
According to the police, Mathew, a jewellery shop employee who is also a relative of Jolly, provided Jolly with the cyanide. He reportedly told the police that he procured the cyanide from Prajikumar after giving him two bottles of alcohol and ₹5,000. Mathew alleges that Jolly asked him for cyanide to kill a rat in her house.

Praji Kumar 
Praji Kumar is a goldsmith who allegedly gave M. S. Mathew the cyanide. He stated that he assumed the poison was being bought to kill a rat.

Cultural references
Antony Perumbavoor announced his upcoming movie would be based on the Koodathayi incident, leading role play by Mohanlal, synchronized actress Dini Daniel launched a poster through social media of her new movie based the same topic in which she plays as Jolly Joseph
Malayalam entertainment-oriented TV channels are airing the same topic in their serials but using a different method of storytelling fencing against legal issues.

A Malayalam serial named Koodathayi was aired on Flowers TV based on the series killing incident. Actress Muktha played the role of killer in the Malayalam serial. Actors like Mallika Sukumaran, Kollam Thulasi, Dayyana Hamid etc, played other roles in that serial.

On 7 September 2020, Spotify launched a ten-episode original podcast, Death, Lies & Cyanide narrated by the journalist Sashi Kumar, based on the murders.

In the popular Indian television show Crime Patrol Satark season 2, broadcast on Sony Pictures Networks India, the episodes 100, 101 and 102 are dedicated to explaining the events in the real case.
It can be found on YouTube.

References

2019 in India
Crime in Kerala
Deaths by poisoning
History of Kerala (1947–present)
Mariticides
Murder in India
Scandals in India